Abhijit Sarkar (born 20 December 1996) is an Indian first-class cricketer who plays for Tripura. He made his List A debut for Tripura in the 2016–17 Vijay Hazare Trophy on 25 February 2017.

He was the leading wicket-taker for Tripura in the 2017–18 Ranji Trophy, with 15 dismissals in six matches.

References

External links
 

1996 births
Living people
Indian cricketers
Tripura cricketers
Cricketers from Tripura
People from Unakoti district